George Alhassan, nicknamed Jair, referring to Jairzinho, is a retired Ghanaian footballer. He is best known for his exploits in the 1982 Africa Cup of Nations which saw him lift the trophy for the second time in his career. During his career he played in Ghana, Gabon and Korea.

He was given the nickname Jair, due to a similar style of play to the Brazilian player Jairzinho.

Club career 
Alhassan played for Accra Great Olympics from 1974 to 1982 and later returned to play in 1985 to 1990. In the process he won the Ghana Premier League in his debut season in 1974. From 1982 to 1984, he played for FC 105 Libreville in Gabon, where he won two trophies, the Gabon Championnat National D1 in 1983 and the Coupe du Gabon Interclubs in 1984.

International career
Alhassan made several appearances for the Ghana national football team, including qualifying matches for several FIFA World Cups. In 1978, he played for the Ghana squad who won the African Cup of Nations in home soil. Four years later he helped Ghana regain the title successfully, being the top scorer of the tournament with four goals, including two against Algeria in the semifinal and one in the final against hosts Libya.

Personal life

George is the father of Kalif Alhassan, a professional football player in the United States with Tampa Bay Rowdies.

After retirement 
In October 2020, he was appointed as the Welfare Officer of his former club Accra Great Olympics.

Honours

Club 
Great Olympics

 Ghana Premier League: 1974

FC 105 Libreville

 Gabon Championnat National D1: 1983
 Coupe du Gabon Interclubs: 1984

International 
Ghana

 African Cup of Nations: 1978, 1982

Individual 

 African Cup of Nations Golden boot: 1982
Africa Cup of Nations Team of the Tournament: 1982
 Ghana Premier League Top scorer: 1977, 1985

References

External links 
 
 I couldn't play in Korea due to pork meat- Ex-Ghana top scorer - George Alhassan Interview
 I am the greatest Ghanaian player of all time - George Alhassan Interview

1955 births
Living people
Africa Cup of Nations-winning players
Ghanaian footballers
Ghanaian expatriate footballers
Ghana international footballers
1978 African Cup of Nations players
1982 African Cup of Nations players
1984 African Cup of Nations players
Ulsan Hyundai FC players
K. Berchem Sport players
K League 1 players
FC 105 Libreville players
Expatriate footballers in Gabon
Expatriate footballers in South Korea
Ghanaian expatriate sportspeople in Gabon
Accra Great Olympics F.C. players
Ghanaian expatriate sportspeople in South Korea
Association football forwards
Accra Great Olympics F.C. non-playing staff
Ghana Premier League top scorers